Club Sport Marítimo de La Guaira, mostly known as Marítimo, is a football team from La Guaira, Venezuela. The club was founded in 1959 by Portuguese immigrants living in Caracas, who based their new club on their favourite team from back home, CS Marítimo, from the island of Madeira, who today compete in the Superliga. The club was dissolved in 1995. And back in 2023 in Second Division of Venezuela

Achievements 
Primera División Venezolana: 4

1986/87, 1987/88, 1989/90, 1992/93

Segunda División Venezolana: 2
1985, 2003/04

Copa de Venezuela: 2
1988, 1989

Performance in CONMEBOL competitions 
Copa Libertadores: 5 appearances
1988: First Round
1989: First Round
1991: First Round
1992: Round of 16
1994: First Round

Copa CONMEBOL: 1 appearance
1992: First Round

References

 
Association football clubs established in 1959
Football clubs in Venezuela
Football clubs in Caracas
1959 establishments in Venezuela
Association football clubs disestablished in 1995
1995 disestablishments in Venezuela
Defunct football clubs in Venezuela